Mourad Hedhli (born 17 February 1991) is a Tunisian professional footballer who plays as a midfielder for Saudi Arabian club Al-Sahel.

Career
On 29 June 2022, Hedhli joined Saudi Arabian club Al-Sahel.

Honours

Club 
Club Africain

 Tunisian Ligue Professionnelle 1: 2014–15

References

External links
  (2012–present)
  (2019–2020)

1991 births
Living people
Tunisian footballers
Club Africain players
AS Gabès players
CS Sfaxien players
Nejmeh SC players
US Tataouine players
Olympique Béja players
Ohod Club players
Al-Sahel SC (Saudi Arabia) players
Tunisian Ligue Professionnelle 1 players
Lebanese Premier League players
Saudi First Division League players
Association football midfielders
Tunisian expatriate footballers
Expatriate footballers in Lebanon
Expatriate footballers in Saudi Arabia
Tunisian expatriate sportspeople in Lebanon
Tunisian expatriate sportspeople in Saudi Arabia